Nikos Eleutheriadis (born 31 August 1937) is a Cypriot footballer. He played in nine matches for the Cyprus national football team from 1960 to 1966.

References

External links
 

1937 births
Living people
Cypriot footballers
Cyprus international footballers
Sportspeople from Nicosia
Association football goalkeepers
AC Omonia players